Loot is a 2008 documentary film directed by Darius Marder. It follows amateur treasure hunter Lance Larson in search of buried treasure from World War II, with the help of the two US war veterans—Darrel Ross and Andrew Seventy—responsible for burying them. A major theme of the film involves the emotional risks of digging up one's past.

The film premiered on HBO2 on May 20, 2009. It won Best Documentary at the 2008 Los Angeles Film Festival.

External links
 Loot Movie Official Webpage
 IMDB: Loot
 HBO: Loot
 2008 LA Film Festival: Loot

Documentary films about veterans